Stuart P. Baker is a United States Navy officer, holding the rank of rear admiral.

Early life and education
Baker is a native of La Crosse, Wisconsin; graduated in 1989 from Miami University in Ohio with a Bachelor of Science in Paper Science and Engineering; and received his commission via the Naval Reserve Officers Training Corps.

Naval career
Baker became an naval aviator in 1991. He received a master's degree from the Naval War College. He was selected for promotion to rear admiral in 2017.

Baker's assignments ashore have included being stationed with Strike Fighter Weapons School Pacific, the Naval Strike and Air Warfare Center as executive officer of the TOPGUN program and United States Fleet Forces Command.

In 2020, Baker was the commanding officer of Carrier Strike Group 9, deployed in the Pacific; he was stationed aboard the aircraft carrier , the flagship of the strike group, which consists of the Theodore Roosevelt and seven other ships. The Theodore Roosevelt departed from its Naval Base San Diego home port in mid-January, with more than 6,000 sailors on board, for a seven-month deployment in the Western Pacific (Indo-Pacific Command) region. In March, during the COVID-19 pandemic, there was an outbreak of  coronavirus disease 2019 aboard the ship, which was ordered to port in Guam. The Theodore Roosevelts captain, Brett Crozier, urged to have most of the sailors immediately removed from the ship, quarantined ashore, and tested for the virus to prevent the spread of the disease. Baker, his superior officer, disagreed, feeling such an action was impractical and too drastic. On March 29, after four days of his pleas being rebuffed by Baker and other superiors, Crozier sent a four-page memorandum to ten Navy officers including Baker and his two immediate superiors, Admiral John C. Aquilino and Vice Admiral DeWolfe Miller III. Crozier begged for the ship to be mostly evacuated because of the risk to the crew. A few days later Crozier was relieved of command by Acting Secretary of the Navy Thomas Modly, who blamed Crozier for sending his memorandum over "non-secure unclassified email" to a "broad array of people" and accused Crozier of having "unnecessarily raised the alarm" about the virus. The day after Crozier's letter became public, the Navy began to evacuate the ship. By 13 April 585 crew members had tested positive for the disease and one had died. A Navy inquiry, whose results were announced on 19 June, concluded that Crozier and Baker made poor decisions regarding the coronavirus outbreak, so that Baker's scheduled promotion to two-star admiral will be put on hold.

References

People from La Crosse, Wisconsin
Military personnel from Wisconsin
United States Navy rear admirals (lower half)
United States Naval Aviators
United States Navy personnel of the Iraq War
Miami University alumni
Naval War College alumni
Living people
Year of birth missing (living people)